Nathan John McAndrew (born 14 July 1993) is an Australian cricketer. 
A pace bowling all-rounder, McAndrew was called into the Sydney Thunder squad for BBL|05, where the Sydney Thunder would ultimately win the championship. He made his Twenty20 debut on 16 January 2016 against the Sydney Sixers.

After linking up with the club through NSW bowling coach Andre Adams, McAndrew made his first-class debut for Auckland on 5 February 2016 in the 2015–16 Plunket Shield, where he played three matches.

McAndrew was first called up to the New South Wales squad in 2019, where he made his List A debut on 22 September 2019, in the 2019–20 Marsh One-Day Cup.

In June 2020, McAndrew was included in the New South Wales contracts list ahead of the 2020/21 season, where he appeared in the 2020–21 Marsh One-Day Cup.

In May 2021, McAndrew signed with South Australia for the 2021/22 season. McAndrew made his Sheffield Shield debut in the opening game of the 2021-22 Sheffield Shield season against Western Australia, taking 3/71 in the first innings, including Test players Cameron Bancroft, Cameron Green and Shaun Marsh, and scoring 65*. McAndrew cites his reasons for moving to South Australia as being due to his ambition to play Sheffield Shield in addition to white-ball cricket.

McAndrew is studying Civil Engineering at the University of Wollongong.

References

External links
 

1993 births
Living people
Australian cricketers
Sydney Thunder cricketers
Auckland cricketers
New South Wales cricketers
South Australia cricketers
Sportspeople from Wollongong
Warwickshire cricketers